Lasher Creek is a river in the state of New York. It flows into the Mohawk River near Randall.

References 

Rivers of Montgomery County, New York
Mohawk River
Rivers of New York (state)